The 2017 Liège–Bastogne–Liège was a road cycling one-day race that took place on 23 April. It was the 103rd edition of the Liège–Bastogne–Liège and the eighteenth event of the 2017 UCI World Tour. It was won for the fourth time by Alejandro Valverde.

Teams
As Liège–Bastogne–Liège was a UCI World Tour event, all eighteen UCI WorldTeams were invited automatically and obliged to enter a team in the race. Seven UCI Professional Continental teams competed, completing the 25-team peloton.

Result

References

External links

2017 UCI World Tour
2017 in Belgian sport
2017
April 2017 sports events in Europe